is a town located in Chiba Prefecture, Japan. , the town had an estimated population of 13,637 in 5234 households and a population density of 300 persons per km².

Geography
Tōnoshō is located in far northeastern Chiba Prefecture approximately 55 kilometers from then prefectural capital at Chiba and 80 to 90 kilometers from central Tokyo. It is bordered to the north by the Tone River, which also forms the border with Ibaraki Prefecture. The area is part of the Kantō Plain and is mostly flat, and much is from 40 to 50 meters above sea level in average elevation.

Neighboring municipalities
Chiba Prefecture
Chōshi
Asahi
Katori
Kamisu

Climate
Tōnoshō has a humid subtropical climate (Köppen Cfa) characterized by warm summers and cool winters with light to no snowfall.  The average annual temperature in Tōnoshō is 14.5 °C. The average annual rainfall is 1462 mm with September as the wettest month. The temperatures are highest on average in August, at around 25.8 °C, and lowest in January, at around 4.2 °C.

Demographics
Per Japanese census data, the population of Tōnoshō has been decreasing over the past 40 years.

History
The area around Tōnoshō has been inhabited since at least the Japanese Paleolithic, and archaeologists have found stone tools and tombs from the Kofun period.  During the Kamakura and Muromachi periods, the area was under control of the Chiba clan. After the start of the Edo period, much of the area of Tōnoshō was part of Omigawa Domain, a minor feudal domain under the Tokugawa shogunate.

After the Meiji Restoration, the villages of Tōjō, Tachibana, Jindai and Sasagawa were  founded on April 1, 1889 within Katori District of Chiba Prefecture with the creation of the modern municipalities system. Sasagawa was elevated to town status on  August 1, 1907. The area rapidly developed with the coming of the Narita Line railway and the development of the Kashima Industrial Complex in neighboring Ibaraki Prefecture after World War II. The town of Tōnoshō was created on July 20, 1955 through the merger of Sasagawa with Tachibana, Jindai and Tōjō villages.

Government
Tōnoshō has a mayor-council form of government with a directly elected mayor and a unicameral town council of 15 members. Tōnoshō, together with the city of Chōshi, contributes two members to the Chiba Prefectural Assembly. In terms of national politics, the town is part of Chiba 10th district of the lower house of the Diet of Japan.

Economy
Tōnoshō is a regional commercial center whose economy is primarily agricultural, with some light manufacturing industries. The main crops include rice and turnips.  Industry includes fish processing and the production of soy sauce.

Education
Tōnoshō has one public elementary school and one public middle school operated by the town government. The town does not have a high school.

Transportation

Railway
 JR East –  Narita Line
  -

Highway

Notable people 
Motoo Hayashi, politician

References

External links

Official Website 

Towns in Chiba Prefecture
Populated places established in 1955
Tōnoshō